What Love Has...Joined Together is a 1970 album by R&B group Smokey Robinson & The Miracles on Motown Records' Tamla label. A concept album consisting solely of six short love songs, it charted at number 97 on the Billboard Top 200 Album chart, and reached the Top 10 of Billboard's R&B album chart, peaking at number 9. It was the first Miracles album to have no new songs; the recordings are all cover versions of songs written by noted composers, such as Stevie Wonder ("My Cherie Amour"), Berry Gordy, Frank Wilson, Brenda Holloway and her sister Patrice Holloway ("You've Made Me So Very Happy"), Burt Bacharach and Hal David ("This Guy's in Love With You"), Marvin Gaye ("If This World Were Mine"), The Beatles' John Lennon & Paul McCartney, ("And I Love Her"), and Miracles members Smokey Robinson and Bobby Rogers ("What Love Has Joined Together").

The Miracles performed a medley of this album's songs on a 1970 telecast of NBC's The Andy Williams Show. What Love Has...Joined Together features Miracles members Smokey Robinson, Bobby Rogers, Pete Moore and Ronnie White on the front cover, and Claudette Robinson on the back cover. Miracles member Marv Tarplin played guitar on this album, but was not featured on its cover.

Release
What Love Has....Joined Together was released on CD in 1992.

In 2013, Motown released this album as a digital download on Amazon, iTunes, and several other websites.

Reception

Allmusic Guide called it "A stunning concept album that should have fared better". The New Yorker, in an article dated April 16, 2013, referred to this album as "A standout", and as "one of the rare jewels in the (Motown) label's crown".

Track listing

Side one 
"What Love Has Joined Together" (Smokey Robinson, Bobby Rogers) 5:50
"My Cherie Amour" (Stevie Wonder, Hank Cosby, Sylvia Moy) 4:16
"If This World Were Mine" (Marvin Gaye) 4:30

Side two 
"You've Made Me So Very Happy" (Frank Wilson, Patrice Holloway, Berry Gordy, Brenda Holloway) 5:04
"This Guy's in Love With You" (Burt Bacharach, Hal David) 5:19
"And I Love Her" (John Lennon, Paul McCartney) 2:37

Personnel

The Miracles

Smokey Robinson – lead vocals, production
Claudette Robinson – lead vocals, backing vocals
Bobby Rogers – backing vocals
Pete Moore – backing vocals
Ronnie White – backing vocals
Marv Tarplin – guitar

Other instrumentation

The Funk Brothers

References

External links 
 All Music Guide Album review
 TV.com. The Miracles''' appearance on The Andy Williams Show'', March 7th , 1970

1970 albums
The Miracles albums
Tamla Records albums
Albums produced by Smokey Robinson
Concept albums
Albums recorded at Hitsville U.S.A.